Lucifer is one of various figures in folklore associated with the planet Venus. The entity's name was subsequently absorbed into Christianity as a name for the devil. Modern scholarship generally translates the term in the relevant Bible passage (Isaiah 14:12), where the Greek Septuagint reads ὁ ἑωσφόρος ὁ πρωὶ, as "morning star" or "shining one" rather than as a proper noun, Lucifer, as found in the Latin Vulgate. 

As a name for the Devil in Christian theology, the more common meaning in English, "Lucifer" is the rendering of the Hebrew word , (pronunciation: hay-lale) in Isaiah given in the King James Version of the Bible. The translators of this version took the word from the Latin Vulgate, which translated  by the Latin word  (uncapitalized), meaning "the morning star", "the planet Venus", or, as an adjective, "light-bringing".

As a name for the planet in its morning aspect, "Lucifer" (Light-Bringer) is a proper noun and is capitalized in English. In Greco-Roman civilization, it was often personified and considered a god and in some versions considered a son of Aurora (the Dawn). A similar name used by the Roman poet Catullus for the planet in its evening aspect is "Noctifer" (Night-Bringer).

Roman folklore and etymology

In Roman folklore, Lucifer ("light-bringer" in Latin) was the name of the planet Venus, though it was often personified as a male figure bearing a torch. The Greek name for this planet was variously Phosphoros (also meaning "light-bringer") or Heosphoros (meaning "dawn-bringer"). Lucifer was said to be "the fabled son of Aurora and Cephalus, and father of Ceyx". It is used in its astronomical sense both in prose and poetry. Poets sometimes personify the star, placing it in a mythological context.

Lucifer's mother Aurora corresponds to goddesses in other cultures.  The name "Aurora" is cognate to the name of the Vedic goddess Ushas, that of the Lithuanian goddess Aušrinė, and that of the Greek goddess Eos, all three of whom are also goddesses of the dawn. All four are considered derivatives of the Proto-Indo-European stem  (later ), "dawn", a stem that also gave rise to Proto-Germanic , Old Germanic  and Old English . (Whence also Modern German "Österreich" meaning "Eastern Kingdom", as well as Modern English "east".) This agreement has led scholars to reconstruct a Proto-Indo-European dawn goddess.

The 2nd-century Roman mythographer Pseudo-Hyginus said of the planet:

The Latin poet Ovid, in his 1st-century epic , describes Lucifer as ordering the heavens:

Ovid, speaking of Phosphorus and Hesperus (the Evening Star, the evening appearance of the planet Venus) as identical, makes him the father of Daedalion. Ovid also makes him the father of Ceyx, while the Latin grammarian Servius makes him the father of the Hesperides or of Hesperis.

In the classical Roman period, Lucifer was not typically regarded as a deity and had few, if any, myths, though the planet was associated with various deities and often poetically personified. Cicero stated that "You say that Sol the Sun and Luna the Moon are deities, and the Greeks identify the former with Apollo and the latter with Diana. But if Luna (the Moon) is a goddess, then Lucifer (the Morning-Star) also and the rest of the Wandering Stars will have to be counted gods; and if so, then the Fixed Stars as well."

Planet Venus, Sumerian folklore, and fall from heaven motif 

The motif of a heavenly being striving for the highest seat of heaven only to be cast down to the underworld has its origins in the motions of the planet Venus, known as the morning star.

The Sumerian goddess Inanna (Babylonian Ishtar) is associated with the planet Venus, and Inanna's actions in several of her myths, including Inanna and Shukaletuda and Inanna's Descent into the Underworld appear to parallel the motion of Venus as it progresses through its synodic cycle.

A similar theme is present in the Babylonian myth of Etana. The Jewish Encyclopedia comments:

The fall from heaven motif also has a parallel in Canaanite mythology. In ancient Canaanite religion, the morning star is personified as the god Attar, who attempted to occupy the throne of Ba'al and, finding he was unable to do so, descended and ruled the underworld. The original myth may have been about the lesser god Helel trying to dethrone the Canaanite high god El, who lived on a mountain to the north. Hermann Gunkel's reconstruction of the myth told of a mighty warrior called Hêlal, whose ambition was to ascend higher than all the other stellar divinities, but who had to descend to the depths; it thus portrayed as a battle the process by which the bright morning star fails to reach the highest point in the sky before being faded out by the rising sun. However, the Eerdmans Commentary on the Bible argues that no evidence has been found of any Canaanite myth or imagery of a god being forcibly thrown from heaven, as in the Book of Isaiah (see below). It argues that the closest parallels with Isaiah's description of the king of Babylon as a fallen morning star cast down from heaven are to be found not in Canaanite myths, but in traditional ideas of the Jewish people, echoed in the Biblical account of the fall of Adam and Eve, cast out of God's presence for wishing to be as God, and the picture in Psalm 82 of the "gods" and "sons of the Most High" destined to die and fall. This Jewish tradition has echoes also in Jewish pseudepigrapha such as 2 Enoch and the Life of Adam and Eve. The Life of Adam and Eve, in turn, shaped the idea of Iblis in the Quran.

The Greek myth of Phaethon, a personification of the planet Jupiter, follows a similar pattern.

Christianity

In the Bible 
The title  refers to the planet Venus as the morning star, and that is how the Hebrew word is usually interpreted. According to the King James Bible-based Strong's Concordance, the original Hebrew word means "shining one, light-bearer", and the English translation given in the King James text is the Latin name for the planet Venus, "Lucifer", as it was already in the Wycliffe Bible.

Present-day translations render  as "morning star" (New International Version, New Century Version, New American Standard Bible, Good News Translation, Holman Christian Standard Bible, Contemporary English Version, Common English Bible, Complete Jewish Bible), "daystar" (New Jerusalem Bible, The Message), "Day Star" (New Revised Standard Version, English Standard Version), "shining one" (New Life Version, New World Translation, JPS Tanakh), or "shining star" (New Living Translation).

In a modern translation from the original Hebrew, the passage in which the phrase "Lucifer" or "morning star" occurs begins with the statement: "On the day the Lord gives you relief from your suffering and turmoil and from the harsh labour forced on you, you will take up this taunt against the king of Babylon: How the oppressor has come to an end! How his fury has ended!" After describing the death of the king, the taunt continues:

For the unnamed "king of Babylon", a wide range of identifications have been proposed. They include a Babylonian ruler of the prophet Isaiah's own time, the later Nebuchadnezzar II, under whom the Babylonian captivity of the Jews began, or Nabonidus, and the Assyrian kings Tiglath-Pileser, Sargon II and Sennacherib. Verse 20 says that this king of Babylon will not be "joined with them [all the kings of the nations] in burial, because thou hast destroyed thy land, thou hast slain thy people; the seed of evil-doers shall not be named for ever", but rather be cast out of the grave, while "All the kings of the nations, all of them, sleep in glory, every one in his own house". Herbert Wolf held that the "king of Babylon" was not a specific ruler but a generic representation of the whole line of rulers.

Isaiah 14:12 became a source for the popular conception of the fallen angel motif. Rabbinical Judaism has rejected any belief in rebel or fallen angels. In the 11th century, the Pirkei De-Rabbi Eliezer illustrates the origin of the "fallen angel myth" by giving two accounts, one relates to the angel in the Garden of Eden who seduces Eve, and the other relates to the angels, the  who cohabit with the daughters of man (Genesis 6:1–4). An association of Isaiah 14:12–18 with a personification of evil, called the devil, developed outside of mainstream Rabbinic Judaism in pseudepigrapha, and later in Christian writings, particularly with the apocalypses.

As the devil 

The metaphor of the morning star that Isaiah 14:12 applied to a king of Babylon gave rise to the general use of the Latin word for "morning star", capitalized, as the original name of the devil before his fall from grace, linking Isaiah 14:12 with Luke 10 ("I saw Satan fall like lightning from heaven") and interpreting the passage in Isaiah as an allegory of Satan's fall from heaven.

Considering pride as a major sin peaking in self-deification, Lucifer became the template for the devil. As a result, Lucifer was identified with the devil in Christianity and in Christian popular literature, as in Dante Alighieri's Inferno, Joost van den Vondel's Lucifer, and John Milton's Paradise Lost. Early medieval Christianity fairly distinguished between Lucifer and Satan. While Lucifer, as the devil, is fixated in hell, Satan executes the desires of Lucifer as his vassal.

Interpretations 

 
Aquila of Sinope derives the word , the Hebrew name for the morning star, from the verb  (to lament). This derivation was adopted as a proper name for an angel who laments the loss of his former beauty. The Christian church fathers – for example Hieronymus, in his Vulgate – translated this as Lucifer. The equation of Lucifer with the fallen angel probably occurred in 1st century Palestinian Judaism. The church fathers brought the fallen lightbringer Lucifer into connection with the Devil on the basis of a saying of Jesus in the Gospel of Luke (10.18 EU): "I saw Satan fall from heaven like lightning."

Some Christian writers have applied the name "Lucifer" as used in the Book of Isaiah, and the motif of a heavenly being cast down to the earth, to the devil. Sigve K. Tonstad argues that the New Testament War in Heaven theme of Revelation 12, in which the dragon "who is called the devil and Satan [...] was thrown down to the earth", was derived from the passage about the Babylonian king in Isaiah 14. Origen (184/185–253/254) interpreted such Old Testament passages as being about manifestations of the devil. Origen was not the first to interpret the Isaiah 14 passage as referring to the devil: he was preceded by at least Tertullian, who in his  (book 5, chapters 11 and 17) twice presents as spoken by the devil the words of Isaiah 14:14: "I will ascend above the tops of the clouds; I will make myself like the Most High". Though Tertullian was a speaker of the language in which the word "lucifer" was created, "Lucifer" is not among the numerous names and phrases he used to describe the devil. Even at the time of the Latin writer Augustine of Hippo (354–430), a contemporary of the composition of the Vulgate, "Lucifer" had not yet become a common name for the devil.

Augustine of Hippo's work  (5th century) became the major opinion of Western demonology including in the Catholic Church. For Augustine, the rebellion of the devil was the first and final cause of evil. By this he rejected some earlier teachings about Satan having fallen when the world was already created. Further, Augustine rejects the idea that envy could have been the first sin (as some early Christians believed, evident from sources like Cave of Treasures in which Satan has fallen because he envies humans and refused to prostrate himself before Adam), since pride ("loving yourself more than others and God") is required to be envious ("hatred for the happiness of others"). He argues that evil came first into existence by the free will of Lucifer. Lucifer's attempt to take God's throne is not an assault on the gates of heaven, but a turn to solipsism in which the devil becomes God in his world. When the King of Babel uttered his phrase in Isaiah, he was speaking through the spirit of Lucifer, the head of devils. He concluded that everyone who falls away from God are within the body of Lucifer, and is a devil.

Adherents of the King James Only movement and others who hold that Isaiah 14:12 does indeed refer to the devil have decried the modern translations. An opposing view attributes to Origen the first identification of the "Lucifer" of Isaiah 14:12 with the devil and to Tertullian and Augustine of Hippo the spread of the story of Lucifer as fallen through pride, envy of God and jealousy of humans.

The 1409 Lollard manuscript titled Lanterne of Light associated Lucifer with the deadly sin of the pride.

Protestant theologian John Calvin rejected the identification of Lucifer with Satan or the devil. He said: "The exposition of this passage, which some have given, as if it referred to Satan, has arisen from ignorance: for the context plainly shows these statements must be understood in reference to the king of the Babylonians." Martin Luther also considered it a gross error to refer this verse to the devil.

Counter-Reformation writers, like Albertanus of Brescia, classified the seven deadly sins each to a specific Biblical demon. He, as well as Peter Binsfield, assigned Lucifer to the sin pride.

Gnosticism 
Since Lucifer's sin mainly consists of self-deification, some Gnostic sects identified Lucifer with the creator deity in the Old Testament. In the Bogomil and Cathar text Gospel of the Secret Supper, Lucifer is a glorified angel but fell from heaven to establish his own kingdom and became the Demiurge who created the material world and trapped souls from heaven inside matter. Jesus descended to earth to free the captured souls. In contrast to mainstream Christianity, the cross was denounced as a symbol of Lucifer and his instrument in an attempt to kill Jesus.

Latter Day Saint movement 
Lucifer is regarded within the Latter Day Saint movement as the pre-mortal name of the devil. Mormon theology teaches that in a heavenly council, Lucifer rebelled against the plan of God the Father and was subsequently cast out. The Doctrine and Covenants reads:

After becoming Satan by his fall, Lucifer "goeth up and down, to and fro in the earth, seeking to destroy the souls of men". Members of the Church of Jesus Christ of Latter-day Saints consider Isaiah 14:12 to be referring to both the king of the Babylonians and the devil.

Other occurrences

Anthroposophy
Rudolf Steiner's writings, which formed the basis for Anthroposophy, characterised Lucifer as a spiritual opposite to Ahriman, with Christ between the two forces, mediating a balanced path for humanity. Lucifer represents an intellectual, imaginative, delusional, otherworldly force which might be associated with visions, subjectivity, psychosis and fantasy. He associated Lucifer with the religious/philosophical cultures of Egypt, Rome and Greece. Steiner believed that Lucifer, as a supersensible Being, had incarnated in China about 3000 years before the birth of Christ.

Luciferianism
Luciferianism is a belief structure that venerates the fundamental traits that are attributed to Lucifer. The custom, inspired by the teachings of Gnosticism, usually reveres Lucifer not as the devil, but as a savior, a guardian or instructing spirit or even the true god as opposed to Jehovah.

In Anton LaVey's The Satanic Bible, Lucifer is one of the four crown princes of hell, particularly that of the East, the 'lord of the air', and is called the bringer of light, the morning star, intellectualism, and enlightenment.

Freemasonry
Léo Taxil (1854–1907) claimed that Freemasonry is associated with worshipping Lucifer. In what is known as the Taxil hoax, he alleged that leading Freemason Albert Pike had addressed "The 23 Supreme Confederated Councils of the world" (an invention of Taxil), instructing them that Lucifer was God, and was in opposition to the evil god Adonai.  Taxil promoted a book by Diana Vaughan (actually written by himself, as he later confessed publicly) that purported to reveal a highly secret ruling body called the Palladium, which controlled the organization and had a satanic agenda. As described by Freemasonry Disclosed in 1897:

Supporters of Freemasonry assert that, when Albert Pike and other Masonic scholars spoke about the "Luciferian path," or the "energies of Lucifer," they were referring to the Morning Star, the light bearer, the search for light; the very antithesis of dark. Pike says in Morals and Dogma, "Lucifer, the Son of the Morning! Is it  who bears the Light, and with its splendors intolerable blinds feeble, sensual, or selfish Souls? Doubt it not!" Much has been made of this quote.

Taxil's work and Pike's address continue to be quoted by anti-masonic groups.

In Devil-Worship in France, Arthur Edward Waite compared Taxil's work to today's tabloid journalism, replete with logical and factual inconsistencies.

Charles Godfrey Leland
In a collection of folklore and magical practices supposedly collected in Italy by Charles Godfrey Leland and published in his Aradia, or the Gospel of the Witches, the figure of Lucifer is featured prominently as both the brother and consort of the goddess Diana, and father of Aradia, at the center of an alleged Italian witch-cult. In Leland's mythology, Diana pursued her brother Lucifer across the sky as a cat pursues a mouse. According to Leland, after dividing herself into light and darkness:

Here, the motions of Diana and Lucifer once again mirror the celestial motions of the moon and Venus, respectively. Though Leland's Lucifer is based on the classical personification of the planet Venus, he also incorporates elements from Christian tradition, as in the following passage:

In the several modern Wiccan traditions based in part on Leland's work, the figure of Lucifer is usually either omitted or replaced as Diana's consort with either the Etruscan god Tagni, or Dianus (Janus, following the work of folklorist James Frazer in The Golden Bough).

Gallery

Modern popular culture

See also

 Angra Mainyu
 Aphrodite
 Astarte
 Asura
 Aurvandil, aka Earendel
 Azazel
 Devil in popular culture
 Doctor Faustus, tragic play by Christopher Marlowe
 Erlik
 Guardian of the Threshold
 Inferno, first of the three canticas of Dante's Divine Comedy
 Luceafărul, a literary magazine
 Luceafărul, a poem by the poet Mihai Eminescu
 Lucifer and Prometheus
 The Lucifer Effect
 Luciform body
 Lucis Trust 
 Phosphorus, the morning star, aka Eosphorus and Heosphorus
 Shahar

Notes

References

Further reading

External links

The Editors of Encyclopædia Britannica (2010). Lucifer (classical mythology). Encyclopaedia Britannica. Encyclopædia Britannica, inc.

 
Babylonian kings
Bogomilism
Book of Isaiah
Children of Eos
Christian terminology
Dawn
Dawn gods
Light gods
Devils
Fallen angels
Hell (Christianity)
Luciferianism
Roman gods
Satan
Satanism
Stellar gods
Venusian deities
Vulgate Latin words and phrases